Joe Vernon Mobra (January 6, 1933 – March 8, 1981) was a Canadian football player who played for the Edmonton Eskimos. He won the Grey Cup with the Eskimos in 1956. Mobra attended and played football at the University of Oklahoma.

References

1933 births
1981 deaths
American players of Canadian football
Edmonton Elks players
Oklahoma Sooners football players
People from Wyandotte County, Kansas
Players of American football from Kansas